Claire de Pourtales (born 20 April 1969, in Paris) is a British former alpine skier who competed in the 1992 Winter Olympics (Alpine Skiing, Slalom, and Combined) and in the 1994 Winter Olympics (Alpine skiing and Slalom). She now lives in Exeter.

References

1969 births
Living people
Sportspeople from Paris
British female alpine skiers
Olympic alpine skiers of Great Britain
Alpine skiers at the 1992 Winter Olympics
Alpine skiers at the 1994 Winter Olympics